Herbert Brown (born March 14, 1936) is an American basketball coach and the brother of Hall of Fame coach Larry Brown. He is the former head coach of the Detroit Pistons (1976–78).

Career
Brown succeeded Ray Scott when he was promoted from assistant to head coach of a Detroit Pistons team that was at 17–25 on January 26, 1976. The 39-year-old Brown went 19–21 in his first season with the Pistons who won 10 of their last 11 games of the regular season. He then guided the team into the second round of the NBA playoffs where the Pistons lost to Golden State, four games to two.

The following season, the Pistons went 44–38 under Brown, before losing in the first round of the playoffs to the Golden State Warriors.

The Pistons fired Brown on December 15, 1977, after a 9–15 start to the 1977–78 NBA season, replacing him with the team's 32-year-old general manager, Bob Kauffman, who went 29–29 as head coach.

In 1978, Brown was named head coach of the Tucson Gunners, a franchise in the newly formed Western Basketball Association (WBA).  He was named WBA Coach of the Year after guiding the team to a 32–16 record and the league championship, where Tucson beat Reno (which was coached by Bill Musselman), four games to three.

Brown was head coach of the Puerto Rico Coquis of the Continental Basketball Association (CBA) from 1983–85, going 28–16 and 27–21, in 1983–84 and 1984–85, respectively.  He earned CBA Coach of the Year honors following the 1983–84 season. He also coached the Cincinnati Slammers of the CBA in 1985–86.

In June 1990, Brown was named head coach and vice president of basketball operations for the Baltimore BayRunners of the International Basketball League (IBL).  He was fired after going 10–20 in the team's inaugural season.  The BayRunners won just seven more games after firing Brown to finish the season at 17–47.

The Bobcats are Brown's third team on which he has served under brother Larry.  Together, they helped coach the Pistons to the NBA championship in 2004, and led the Philadelphia 76ers to the 2001 NBA Finals.

Brown has also served as an assistant coach for several teams, including the Portland Trail Blazers, Houston Rockets, Indiana Pacers, Phoenix Suns, and Atlanta Hawks.  He also coached overseas, most notably in Spain in the early 1990s.

At the college level, Brown was head basketball coach at Stony Brook University from 1964–69, earning Coach of the Year honors following the 1969 season.

Brown served as head coach at C.W. Post (of Long Island University) from 1972–74, going 21–5 and 13–12 over two seasons.

On September 3, 2014, Brown was named an assistant coach at Portland.

Head coaching record

College

NBA

|-
| style="text-align:left;"|Detroit
| style="text-align:left;"|
| 40 || 19 || 21 ||  || style="text-align:center;"|2nd in Midwest || 9 || 4 || 5 || 
| style="text-align:center;"|Lost in Conf. Semifinals
|-
| style="text-align:left;"|Detroit
| style="text-align:left;"|
| 82 || 44 || 38 ||  || style="text-align:center;"|2nd in Midwest || 3 || 1 || 2 || 
| style="text-align:center;"|Lost in First Round
|-
| style="text-align:left;"|Detroit
| style="text-align:left;"|
| 24 || 9 || 15 ||  || style="text-align:center;"|(fired)|| — || — || — || — 
| style="text-align:center;"|—
|- class="sortbottom"
| style="text-align:left;"|Career
| || 146 || 72 || 74 ||  || || 12 || 5 || 7 ||  ||

WBA

CBA

IBL

Personal life and education
Born in Brooklyn, New York, Brown is a graduate of the University of Vermont.  The author of three books about basketball, he runs a Basketball Academy in the summer at the New Jersey Y Camps.  In 2006, he was inducted into the National Jewish Sports Hall of Fame and Museum.

Brown now lives in Portland, Oregon, with his wife.  He has two children—in Charlotte and Atlanta—and two stepchildren.

References

External links
 NBA profile

1936 births
Living people
American men's basketball players
Atlanta Hawks assistant coaches
Basketball players from New York City
Basketball coaches from New York (state)
College men's basketball head coaches in the United States
Charlotte Bobcats assistant coaches
Chicago Bulls assistant coaches
Continental Basketball Association coaches
Detroit Pistons assistant coaches
Detroit Pistons head coaches
Houston Rockets assistant coaches
Indiana Pacers assistant coaches
Jewish American sportspeople
Jewish men's basketball players
Joventut Badalona coaches
Liga ACB players
LIU Post Pioneers men's basketball coaches
Saski Baskonia coaches
Sportspeople from Brooklyn
Phoenix Suns assistant coaches
Portland Pilots men's basketball coaches
Portland Trail Blazers assistant coaches
Stony Brook Seawolves men's basketball coaches
Vermont Catamounts men's basketball players
Valencia Basket coaches
Western Basketball Association coaches
International Basketball League (1999–2001) coaches
21st-century American Jews